1917 in philosophy

Events

Publications

Births
 August 25 - J. L. Mackie (died 1981)
 September 26 - Tran Duc Thao (died 1993)

Deaths
 March 17 - Franz Brentano (born 1838)

Philosophy
20th-century philosophy
Philosophy by year